Deren Ibrahim (born 9 March 1991) is a retired Gibraltarian footballer who mostly played for English club Dartford and the Gibraltar national team as a goalkeeper. He is currently goalkeeping coach at Gillingham and Wales U19.

Career

Club
Between the ages of 8 and 11, Ibrahim was a member of the academy of Queens Park Rangers. Ibrahim advanced through the youth levels of Dartford beginning in 2001 before making his debut on 13 March 2008. In 2010, he signed a 3-month loan contract with St. Andrews of Malta. He has also had loan spells with Sittingbourne, Margate, Maidstone United, Leatherhead, and Phoenix Sports. He made a total of 8 appearances for Margate. In 2014, he signed a short-term loan with Tonbridge Angels. At the age of 24 in 2015, Ibrahim was named Dartford's first-choice goalkeeper after making 37 appearances for the club since his league debut in 2008. Ibrahim scored his first goal for Dartford on 27 August 2016 on a free-kick from his own half against Hungerford Town and his second against Chippenham Town on 13 October 2018 again from a free kick in his own half.

In October 2018, Ibrahim departed Dartford to take up an academy goalkeeping coach role at Charlton Athletic.

In March 2019, Ibrahim played one FA Vase game for Cray Valley PM.

On 30 March 2019, Ibrahim joined Tonbridge Angels until the end of the 2018–19 season. However, he returned to Cray Valley PM in May 2019 to sit on the bench in the 2019 FA Vase Final.

International
Ibrahim was called up to the Gibraltar national football team for the first time in October 2016 for 2018 FIFA World Cup qualifiers against Estonia and Belgium. He made his international debut in the match against Belgium, an eventual 0–6 defeat.

International career statistics

Coaching career
On 14 February 2022, Ibrahim was announced to have joined the coaching staff of League One side Gillingham.

References

External links
 
 
 Dartford F.C. profile
 Deflect GK profile

1988 births
Living people
Gibraltarian footballers
Gibraltar international footballers
Gibraltarian expatriate footballers
English footballers
English people of Gibraltarian descent
Association football goalkeepers
Dartford F.C. players
Leatherhead F.C. players
Tonbridge Angels F.C. players
Maidstone United F.C. players
Margate F.C. players
Sittingbourne F.C. players
Expatriate footballers in Malta
St. Andrews F.C. players
Charlton Athletic F.C. non-playing staff
West Ham United F.C. non-playing staff
Gillingham F.C. non-playing staff
Association football goalkeeping coaches
Gibraltarian expatriate sportspeople in Malta
English expatriate sportspeople in Malta
English expatriate footballers